Max Julius Louis Le Blanc (26 May 1865 – 31 July 1943) was a German physical chemist who worked in the field of electrochemistry, writing an influential textbook in 1895 on the subject which went through several editions. He was a professor at the Technical University of Karlsruhe, later at the Wilhelm Ostwald Institute at Leipzig and a signatory to the 1933 Vow of allegiance of the Professors of the German Universities and High-Schools to Adolf Hitler and the National Socialistic State. 

Le Blanc was born in Barten to  builder Louis and his wife Marie Kickton and after studying at the Gymnasium in Rastenburg, he went to the universities at Tübingen and Berlin. His doctoral work of 1888 was on organic chemistry under August Wilhelm von Hofmann. He however moved to physical chemistry and worked under Wilhelm Ostwald at Leipzig from 1891. He worked in electrochemistry at Hoechst AG from 1896 to 1901 and subsequently taught physical chemistry at the technical institute, Karlsruhe. He returned to Leipzig succeeding Wilhelm Ostwald in 1906. Le Blanc's work was chiefly on electrolytes and an understanding of voltages and decomposition potentials. He also discovered that a layer of hydrogen around a platinum electrode makes it effectively a hydrogen electrode. His work in industry included methods for regenerating chromic acid in dye manufacture and for rubber during World War I.

References

External links 
 The elements of electro-chemistry (1896)
 A Text-book of Electro-chemistry (1907, English translation)
 The production of chromium and its compounds by the aid of the electric current (1904)

1865 births
1943 deaths
German chemists